The Men's Boxing Tournament at the 1971 Pan American Games was held in Cali, Colombia, from July 25 to August 6. The light flyweight division (– 48 kilograms) was included for the first time.

Medal winners

Medal table

External links
Amateur Boxing

1971
1971 Pan American Games
Pan American Games